The individual dressage event was part of the equestrian programme at the 1920 Summer Olympics.

Results

References

Sources
 
 

Dressage individual